The men's competition in 69 kg division was staged on September 18–19, 2007.

Schedule

Medalists

Records

Results

References
Results 

Men's 69